Ankur Mittal  (born 30 March 1992) is an Indian shooter. He has won gold in Double Trap event at 2018 ISSF World Shooting Championships at Changwon, South Korea and a silver medal at the 2017 ISSF World Shotgun Championships at Moscow, Russia. He has received Bheem Award from Haryana State and Arjuna Award from President of India in 2018.

Early life and education
Mittal was born on 30 March 1992 in Sonipat, Haryana. He is the son of a former double trap shooter, Ashok Mittal and younger brother of Ajay Mittal who have been into Indian Shooting Team and won several medal including Gold in Asian Championships at Kuwait in 2017. He went to St. Margaret Sr. Sec. School and he was an Arts student at Hansraj College, Delhi and did his MBA from Manav Rachna International University, Faridabad.

Career
Started his career in 2009, he competed in his first National Shooting Championship, where he secured a place in Junior Indian Shooting Team. He has won several medals in junior category(Under 21) till 2012.

In 2013, Mittal was part of the Indian Shooting Team at the 2013 Trap Shooting World Cup held in Acapulco, Mexico.

2014
On 27 July, at Glasgow, Scotland in the Commonwealth Games in the Men's Double trap event, Ankur secured second position in the qualification round with a score of 132 points. He made it to the semi-final where he placed 5th with a score of 25 points. In the same year, he participated at the 2014 Asian Games in Incheon(South Korea), where he was placed 7th. Following he won the 4th Asian Shotgun Championship in Al Ain(UAE) with a score of 141/150.

2016
He won the 6th Asian Shotgun Championship in Abu Dhabi(UAE) with a score of 143/150.

2017
In Delhi, India at the ISSF World Cup, Ankur participated in Double Trap Shooting event and won a silver medal.

In Acapulco, Mexico at the ISSF World Cup in Double Trap Shooting event, Ankur won the Gold Medal creating a World Record.

In Astana, Kazakhstan at the 7th Asian Shotgun Championship,  Ankur won a gold medal in Double Trap Shooting event as well as a team gold medal.

In Moscow, Russia at the ISSF Shotgun World Championships, Ankur participated in Double Trap Shooting event and won a silver medal.

In Brisbane, Australia at the Commonwealth Championships, Ankur won a gold medal in the Double Trap Shooting event.

Ankur Mittal has been ranked as World No. 1 in Double Trap Shooting (Men) and only the second Indian shooter to achieve this feat.

2018 
In Gold Coast, Queensland at the Commonwealth Games, Ankur won a bronze medal in the Double Trap Shooting event with a score of 53 points.

References

External links

http://www.issf-sports.org/competitions/worldranking/complete_ranking_by_event.ashx?event=DT150&evlinkid=301

Living people
1992 births
Sport shooters from Haryana
People from Sonipat
Indian male sport shooters
Shooters at the 2014 Asian Games
Universiade medalists in shooting
Commonwealth Games medallists in shooting
Commonwealth Games bronze medallists for India
Trap and double trap shooters
Shooters at the 2018 Asian Games
Shooters at the 2018 Commonwealth Games
Universiade medalists for India
Asian Games competitors for India
Medalists at the 2015 Summer Universiade
Recipients of the Arjuna Award
21st-century Indian people
Medallists at the 2018 Commonwealth Games